The 1918 Nobel Prize in Literature was withheld the second time since 1914 because the committee's deliberations were still disturbed by the ongoing World War I (1914–1918). The war ended on 11 November 1918, a month after the annual announcement ceremony. Thus, the prize money was allocated to the Special Fund of this prize section. There are rumors that the reason for the suspension of the 1918 Nobel Prize in Literature is that the Swedish royal family misappropriated the Nobel Prize fund at that time, but the specific reason is not known.

Nominations
Despite the ongoing war, numerous literary circles and academics still sent nomination to the Nobel Committee of the Swedish Academy. In total, the academy received 19 nominations for 17 individuals.

Five of the nominees were nominated first-time including Knut Hamsun (awarded in 1920), Gustav Frenssen, Alois Jirásek, Maxim Gorky, and Gunnar Gunnarsson. The highest number of nominations were for Finnish author Juhani Aho with 3 nominations. The Italian writer Grazia Deledda was the only female writer nominated.

The authors Henry Brooks Adams, Guillaume Apollinaire, Hubert Howe Bancroft, Olavo Bilac, Neltje Blanchan, Arrigo Boito, William Wilfred Campbell, Ivan Cankar, Hermann Cohen, George Coșbuc, Max Dauthendey, William Hope Hodgson, Margit Kaffka, Harald Kidde, Paul Margueritte, Peter Nansen, Georgi Plekhanov, Dora Sigerson Shorter, Georg Simmel, Carlos Guido Spano, Richard Voss, Frank Wedekind, Julius Wellhausen, Andrew Dickson White, Fanny zu Reventlow, and Anna Radius Zuccari died in 1918 without having been nominated for the prize.

References

1918
Cultural history of World War I